Ivan Mokhov (born February 22, 1999) is an American pair skater. With his sister and skating partner, Maria Mokhova, he placed fourth at the 2022 Skate America.

On the junior level, Mokhova/Mokhov are the 2019 U.S. junior national pewter medalists.

Personal life 
Mokhov was born on February 22, 1999, in Winter Haven, Florida, to parents Andrei Mokhov and Oksana Yakusheva, both former professional figure skaters originally from the Soviet Union. He has two younger siblings, Maria and Mikhail. Mokhov is bilingual, speaking both English and Russian. As of 2022, he resides in Mason, Michigan, and attends Lansing Community College.

Programs

With Mokhov

Competitive highlights 
GP: Grand Prix; CS: ISU Challenger Series; JGP: Junior Grand Prix

Pairs with Mokhova

Men's Singles

References

External links 

 

1999 births
Living people
American male pair skaters
People from Mason, Michigan
Sportspeople from Winter Haven, Florida
American people of Russian descent
21st-century American people